The 2013 season of the Indian Premier League, abbreviated as IPL 6 or Pepsi IPL 2013, was the sixth season of the IPL, established by the Board of Control for Cricket in India (BCCI) in 2007. The tournament featured nine teams and was held from 3 April to 26 May 2013. The opening ceremony was held at the Salt Lake Stadium in Kolkata on 2 April 2013. This was the first season with PepsiCo as the title sponsor. The Kolkata Knight Riders were the defending champions, having won the 2012 season. A spot fixing case was revealed by Delhi Police, leading to arrest of three cricketers from Rajasthan Royals and other persons. Mumbai Indians won the tournament for the first time, defeating Chennai Super Kings in the final by 23 runs. The tagline was sirf dekhne ka nayi! (Don't just watch!)

Background

Sponsorship
PepsiCo replaced DLF Ltd as the title sponsor starting with the 2013 season. DLF did not renew their contract after their initial five-year contract, for  2.50 billion, ended with the previous season. PepsiCo's contract is  3968 million for five years, ending with the 2017 season. In response to questions about the higher sponsorship costs compared to DLF's, a representative of PepsiCo said, "Our estimate is that we will get five to six times the value of the money we paid." However, Brand Finance had assessed the IPL's brand value to have fallen from $4.1 billion in 2010 to $2.9 billion in 2012, attributed to the decline in television ratings over the two years.

Termination of Deccan Chargers

Deccan Chargers, champions of the 2009 Indian Premier League, became the second team to be terminated from the IPL after Kochi Tuskers Kerala. The owners failed to save the team after several attempts were made with the Bombay High Court and Supreme Court of India. Immediately after the Chargers' termination, the BCCI invited bidders for a replacement team also based in Hyderabad. It was announced on 25 October 2012 that Sun TV Network won the bid at  850.5 million per year. The new team was named the Sunrisers Hyderabad.

Personnel changes

In October 2012, the teams were allowed to release any number of their players from their contracts to reduce their player costs. The released players would have the option of entering the auction. The players' auction was held on 3 February 2013, where 37 players were sold.

Overseas participation
Availability of Bangladeshi players was put in doubt when the Bangladesh Cricket Board considered not issuing the players with the No Objection Certificates they needed to participate in the tournament. Their deliberation was due to the tournament's dates clashing with the Bangladesh tour of Zimbabwe. Regardless, both affected players, Shakib Al Hasan and Tamim Iqbal, missed the start of the tournament due to injury.

Despite the progress on the restoration of cricketing relations between India and Pakistan after the Pakistan national cricket team toured India in December 2012 and January 2013, no Pakistani players were included in the auction. Several South Africans missed the start of the tournament to play in the knockout stage of the Ram Slam T20 Challenge. Two New Zealand players were released early by their teams to join the New Zealand tour of England. Both players were not performing for their teams. Sri Lanka Cricket made a similar request to allow some of their players to join their preparations for the ICC Champions Trophy.

Shortly before the start of the season, the IPL governing council ruled that Sri Lankan cricketers and match officials will not participate in any matches held in Chennai. This was a result of the growing political tensions in Tamil Nadu concerning the ethnic conflict between the Sinhalese and Sri Lankan Tamils. The anti-Sinhalaese sentiments from the people of Tamil Nadu raised security concerns for Sri Lankan involvement. The decision was made after Jayalalithaa, the chief minister of Tamil Nadu, wrote to the Prime Minister of India requesting the ban.

Other than the Chennai Super Kings, the franchises were not in support of the decision as they believed it offered Chennai an added advantage in their home matches. Chennai's Sri Lankan players hold secondary positions in their team while some Sri Lankans in other teams play key roles and their absence in those matches would affect their team strategies. Another concern was with how the decision did not follow the precedence of moving the matches to a different venue. However, the playoff matches originally scheduled to be held in Chennai were later relocated to Delhi.

Opening ceremony
The opening ceremony was held at the largest stadium in India, and the second largest stadium in the world by capacity, the Salt Lake Stadium or Yuva Bharati Krirangan in Kolkata, on 2 April 2013. All nine teams, led by their captains, took the "MCC Spirit of Cricket" pledge. Mamata Banerjee, the Chief Minister of West Bengal, was present at the ceremony. It featured live performances of American rapper Pitbull and Indian film stars Shah Rukh Khan, Katrina Kaif and Deepika Padukone.

Season summary

April
The season began on 3 April with the defending champions the Kolkata Knight Riders defeating the Delhi Daredevils; Kolkata and Australian quick Brett Lee notably getting a wicket off the first ball of the tournament.  Kolkata would then struggle and lose five of their next six matches due to good batting performances only coming from captain Gautam Gambhir and Eoin Morgan. Delhi, who topped the group stage in 2012, had a six-match losing streak due to batting failures apart from three half-centuries from captain Mahela Jayawardene and David Warner. Both Delhi and Kolkata were positioned at the bottom of the points table for the first half of the season.

Two-time runners-up the Royal Challengers Bangalore won six of their first eight matches with a six-of-six home record. This was credited to good death-over bowling from Vinay Kumar and prolific and quick run-scoring from captain Virat Kohli, Chris Gayle and AB de Villiers. This included Gayle's score of 175 not out, the highest in Twenty20 cricket. However, their performances were fluctuant. Included was a 130-run victory, two Super Overs and two other matches involving a tight finish. Two-time champions the Chennai Super Kings were similarly dominant, with good batting from captain Mahendra Singh Dhoni, Michael Hussey and Suresh Raina and an all-round bowling attack. They came up with an IPL record-equalling seven-match winning streak, which took them to the top of the points table.

The Mumbai Indians, who made playoff-stage appearances in each of the past three years, were inconsistent with both batting and bowling. Good batting performances from Dinesh Karthik, Rohit Sharma and Kieron Pollard put Mumbai at the middle of the points table halfway through the season. The Sunrisers Hyderabad produced results contrary to the poor performance last season by their predecessors the Deccan Chargers. With no stand-out individual batting performances, Hyderabad managed to win five of their first seven matches. Their strength was in their strong and economical bowling from an attack centred around Dale Steyn and Amit Mishra. Mishra got the second hat-trick of the season, becoming the first to achieve three IPL hat-tricks.

Also at the middle of the points table was the Rajasthan Royals. They won matches with cohesive batting and bowling where different players delivered match-winning contributions. Shane Watson produced scores of 101 and 98 not out while James Faulkner was briefly the season's top wicket-taker after taking 5 for 20. The Pune Warriors India and the Kings XI Punjab continue their form from 2012. Pune won two matches from eight with significant contributions coming only from Aaron Finch, Steve Smith and Bhuvneshwar Kumar. Punjab had average performances with poor contributions from their international players and a dependency on their less-accomplished local players.

May
In the second half of the season, Chennai continued to be dominant and held their number-one position on the points table while Mumbai, Rajasthan, Bangalore and Hyderabad were evenly matched as they switched between the positions of second to fifth. Mumbai excelled to win seven out of eight matches with improved bowling performances around Mitchell Johnson and Pollard producing an unbeaten innings of 66 runs from 27 balls. Rajasthan were also strong and had four consecutive victories and a perfect record at home. Ajinkya Rahane scored three consecutive half-centuries, Sanju Samson made a strong IPL debut and Watson continued his good form.

Bangalore's schedule had them play six consecutive away matches, of which they could only win two due to their bowling attack struggling on away surfaces and repeatedly failures to defend high scores set by Gayle, Kohli and de Villiers. Hyderabad's bowlers continued to perform while their batting was strengthened with the inclusion of Shikhar Dhawan, who returned from injury after scoring the fastest Test-debut hundred two months ago, and Darren Sammy. Bangalore and Hyderabad slowly fell behind Mumbai and Rajasthan in the points table, allowing a chance for other teams.

Delhi and Pune failed to recover from their poor starts to the season and were the first to be eliminated from the tournament, similar to their performances in 2011. Punjab's form deteriorated as they faced teams at the top-half of the points table, with only Shaun Marsh and David Miller making significant batting contributions. Kolkata showed signs of improvement as their bowlers limited the opposition to low scores but this only lifted their position to sixth. Both Punjab and Kolkata needed to win every one of their remaining matches for any chance of qualification.

With ten matches remaining in the group stage, Chennai, Mumbai and Rajasthan were first to earn playoff stage berths while a few losses by Bangalore and Hyderabad gave Kolkata and Punjab a slim chance of competing for the final spot. Kolkata was eliminated after suffering an upset at home by Pune. Punjab, despite finishing their season with three straight wins, failed to catch up. The tie between Bangalore and Hyderabad came down to the final match of the group stage, between Hyderabad and Kolkata. Hyderabad won to place themselves narrowly ahead of Bangalore by one win and qualify.

Playoff stage

Amidst the spot-fixing controversy and despite Faulkner's second five-wicket haul, Rajasthan finished the group stage with two consecutive losses and gave Mumbai and Chennai the advantageous top two positions. In Qualifier 1 between Chennai and Mumbai, a 140-run partnership between Raina and Hussey against Mumbai's formidable bowling helped Chennai win by 48 runs and qualify for their fifth IPL Final. Dwayne Smith's innings of 68 runs was the only highlight of Mumbai's innings. Rajasthan faced Hyderabad in the Eliminator. On a slow pitch that troubled batsmen, Brad Hodge top-scored with an unbeaten innings of 54 runs to help Rajasthan win in a low-scoring match.

In Qualifier 2, Mumbai defeated Rajasthan by 4 wickets. Mumbai bowled better, as Harbhajan Singh's 3 wickets earned him the man of the match. Smith was again the top-scorer for Mumbai, scoring 68 but better support from other batsmen allowed Mumbai to win with one ball remaining. Mumbai faced Chennai in the Final, in which the Mumbai Indians had a shaky start but due to some great batting by Kieron Pollard (he scored 60*), they managed to reach a score of 148–9. They started well with the ball, reducing Chennai to 39–6, but captain MS Dhoni led from the front. However, he lacked support from the other end. Finally they finished at 125–9, giving the Mumbai Indians an unexpected victory and won their first IPL Title.

Other incidents

Spot-fixing

On 16 May 2013, Rajasthan Royals players Sreesanth, Ankeet Chavan and Ajit Chandila were arrested from Mumbai's Trident Hotel by Delhi Police along with seven bookies on charges of spot-fixing in the tournament. Police sources said the players have been accused of spot-fixing in their matches on 9 and 15 May 2013 against Kings XI Punjab and Mumbai Indians respectively.

Withdrawal by Pune Warriors India
On 21 May 2013, Pune Warriors India terminated their participation in the league due to disagreements with their franchisee fees for the BCCI.

Venues
12 venues were selected to host the matches, with Raipur and Ranchi hosting for the first time in the tournament's history. In the playoff stage, Delhi will host the Qualifier 1 and Eliminator while Kolkata will host the Qualifier 2 and Final. Chennai was originally scheduled to host the playoff stage matches instead of Delhi on account of Chennai and Kolkata being the home venues of the runners-up and champions of the 2012 season. The change was made due to the political tension in Tamil Nadu preventing Sri Lankan players and management staff from entering the state.

Teams and standings

Points table
"C" refers to the champions of the tournament, R to the runners-up.

Group stage

Fixtures

Playoffs

Preliminary

Final

Statistics

Most runs

 The leading run-scorer of the tournament wore an orange cap while fielding.

Most wickets

 The leading wicket-taker of the tournament wore a purple cap while fielding.

References

External links
 Official website
 Tournament website on ESPN Cricinfo 

 
Indian Premier League seasons
Indian Premier League
Indian Premier League